Nadine Messerschmidt (born 15 September 1993) is a German sport shooter, born in Suhl. She won a gold medal in Skeet Team at the 2021 European Shooting Championships. She qualified to represent Germany at the 2020 Summer Olympics in Tokyo 2021, where she placed fifth in women's skeet.

References

1993 births
Living people
People from Suhl
German female sport shooters
Shooters at the 2020 Summer Olympics
Olympic shooters of Germany
Sportspeople from Thuringia
21st-century German women